Konrad Bukowiecki (born 17 March 1997) is a Polish athlete competing primarily in the shot put. He won the silver medal at the 2018 European Championships, gold medals at the 2017 and 2019 European Under-23 Championships, and gold at the 2017 European Indoor Championships.

In 2014 at age 17, Bukowiecki was the World junior champion and, the following year, European junior champion; he was voted European Athletics Male Rising Star of the Year that season. He is the Polish indoor record holder and a four-time national champion.

Personal life
Konrad Bukowiecki was born in Szczytno. His father, Ireneusz Bukowiecki, is a former decathlete.

Career
Bukowiecki is coached by his father. He won the gold medal at the 2014 World Junior Championships and at the 2014 Summer Youth Olympics. In addition, he currently holds the junior indoor world record with the 6 kg implement, as well as world youth indoor bests with the 6 kg and 5 kg implements.

In his debut at the senior level competition, he finished sixth at the 2015 European Indoor Championships with the European absolute best with the 7.26 kg shot. Later that season he added the European Junior title to his accolades and competed at the 2015 World Championships where he, however, failed to record a valid mark.

During the 2016 indoor season Bukowiecki further bettered his European junior best with the senior implement to 20.61 metres. He later finished fourth at the 2016 World Indoor Championships in Portland. He initially won at the 2016 World Junior Championships in Athletics, but was disqualified for an anti-doping offense. It was later proved he took the substance (higenamine) unknowingly in the form of a diet supplement with a "doping free" inscription on the label and the IAAF only punished him with a "public reprimand".

At the 2016 Olympic Games in Rio de Janeiro, Bukowiecki fouled out in the first three rounds of the final, failing to move into the final three rounds.

In 2019, he set his personal best result by beating the 22 meters barrier and achieving 22.25 m during the Kamila Skolimowska Memorial held at the Silesian Stadium in Chorzów.

Achievements

International competitions

1No mark in the final

National titles
 Polish Athletics Championships: 2016, 2019
 Polish Indoor Athletics Championships: 2017, 2022

Personal bests
 Shot put – 22.25 (Chorzów 2019)
 Shot put indoor – 22.00 (Toruń 2018) 
 Shot put (6 kg) – 22.94 (Bojanowo 2016)
 Shot put (6 kg) indoor – 22.96 (Spała 2016) 
 Shot put (5 kg) – 23.17 (Nanjing 2014)
 Shot put (5 kg) indoor – 24.24 (Spała 2014) 
 Discus throw – 58.42 (Suwałki 2017)
 Discus throw (1.75 kg) – 62.20 (Białystok 2016)
 Discus throw (1.5 kg) – 66.52 (Warsaw 2014)

References

External links

PZLA profile

 

1997 births
Living people
Polish male shot putters
Polish male discus throwers
Athletes (track and field) at the 2014 Summer Youth Olympics
World Athletics Championships athletes for Poland
Place of birth missing (living people)
Athletes (track and field) at the 2016 Summer Olympics
Olympic athletes of Poland
People from Szczytno
Universiade medalists in athletics (track and field)
European Athletics Rising Star of the Year winners
Universiade silver medalists for Poland
Universiade gold medalists in athletics (track and field)
Youth Olympic gold medalists for Poland
Medalists at the 2017 Summer Universiade
Medalists at the 2019 Summer Universiade
Youth Olympic gold medalists in athletics (track and field)
Athletes (track and field) at the 2020 Summer Olympics
20th-century Polish people
21st-century Polish people
Doping cases in athletics